Petri Suominen (born 30 April 1971) is a Finnish swimmer. He competed in at the 1988 Summer Olympics and the 1992 Summer Olympics.

References

External links
 

1971 births
Living people
Finnish male breaststroke swimmers
Olympic swimmers of Finland
Swimmers at the 1988 Summer Olympics
Swimmers at the 1992 Summer Olympics
Sportspeople from Turku